Steatocranus bleheri is species of cichlid only found in the Kafubu River system, which is part of the Luapula drainage in the upper Congo River basin, in the Democratic Republic of the Congo, Africa.  This species can reach a length of  TL.

Etymology
The cichlid is named in honor of explorer and ornamental-fish wholesaler Heiko Bleher (b. 1944), who collected the type specimen.

References

bleheri
Taxa named by Manfred K. Meyer
Fish described in 1993